Eddie Castrodad is an American former film, television and stage actor best known for such films and television series as Torch Song Trilogy, Kate & Allie, The Cosby Show, Flanagan, Sesame Street and Dads.

References

External links

American male film actors
American male television actors
American male stage actors
1970 births
Living people
Place of birth missing (living people)